Carduus crispus, the curly plumeless thistle or welted thistle, is a biennial herb in the daisy family Asteraceae. C. crispus is native to multiple different countries all over Europe and Asia, but it is also naturalized in North America. These plants have specific environmental conditions such as the type of soil and the amount of sunlight that must be met before they can grow. There is a breakdown of the species Carduus crispus that tells us the origin and the meaning of each part of the species' name. The leaves, flowers and fruit of this species are described, as well as, the medicinal and wildlife uses.

Distribution 
This species is native to Europe and Asia. Some of the countries in Asia include Armenia, China, and Hebei. Furthermore, the species is also native to places all over Europe, including Austria, Belgium, Czech Republic, Finland, France, Germany, Hungary, Italy, Netherlands, Norway, Poland, Romania, Russia, Spain, Sweden, and Switzerland. In terms of C. crispus being naturalized, it was naturalized in Greenland, and parts of North America: the United States and Canada. It was naturalized to the point where it is now considered a noxious weed in North America.

Description 
This plant grows in a way which it supports its own growth, and individuals can grow up to 3 feet tall. This species flowers from May and seeds ripen in July. It needs a lot of sunlight, and therefore is not shade tolerant. The soil must be wet, and have the proper pH for the plant to grow and thrive. This species can also be called a noxious weed in North America, and can be found in areas such as pastures and along the sides of the road. One property that allows for Carduus crispus to be known as a weed, is that this species’ main form of seed dispersal is wind dispersal. The structural features of the fruit which contains that seed allows for wind dispersal to disperse the species far and wide.

Etymology 
The genus Carduus comes from the Latin language, and it means “a kind of thistle”, or “thistlelike plant”. The term thistle is the common factor between both names. The specific epithet, crispus, also has a Latin origin meaning “curly” or “wavy”.

Morphology

Leaves 

The leaves of this plant are simple, alternate and they start at the base of the pant. The leaves cannot be in leaflets, but they can vary between being lobed and unlobed. The blade edges of the leaves can either be toothed, have lobes, or have both. The top of the leaves does not have a lot of hair, while the bottom side of the leaves has white hair. The size of the leaf blades vary from 10-20 cm in length, and the petioles are winged at the base of the leaves.

Flowers 
Unlike most other members of the Asteraceae family, this plant does not have any ray-shaped flowers, only disk-shaped flowers, with the head width reaching 15 to 18 mm. The colours of the flowers can range from purple to pink and white. The flowers are hermaphrodite, as they have both male and female parts. In terms of pollination and reproduction, before the seeds get dispersed by wind dispersal, they require pollination by insects such as bees.

Fruit 
The type of fruit this species produces is called achenes, and they are yellow or slightly gray and brown in colour. The round-shaped fruit is flattened, and attached to one end are long unbranched hairs that aid with dispersing the seeds far and wide, with the help of winder dispersal.

Uses

Wildlife
The species and genus is a favorite food plant of caterpillars of the painted lady butterfly (Vanessa cardui), which derives its specific epithet, cardui, from their preference for Carduus thistles. It is also used by bees for honey production.

Medicinal
This plant has been found to have anti-tumour properties, the active ingredient is Crispine B, an alkaloid that has cytotoxic properties, meaning that Crispine B is toxic enough to prevent cancer cells from replicating.

The roots of C. crispus are said to have anodyne properties which are pain-killing properties that lessen the pain an organism is experiencing.

Invasive species
Carduus crispus is an introduced species in North America, and a noxious weed in several U.S. states, including West Virginia.

References

External links

crispus
Flora of Europe
Flora of temperate Asia
Flora of Jammu and Kashmir
Butterfly food plants
Medicinal plants of Asia
Medicinal plants of Europe
Plants described in 1753
Taxa named by Carl Linnaeus